Savage Frontier is a 1953 American Western film directed by Harry Keller and starring Allan Lane, Dorothy Patrick and Eddy Waller.

The film's sets were designed by the art director Frank Arrigo.

Plot

Cast

References

Bibliography
 Bernard A. Drew. Motion Picture Series and Sequels: A Reference Guide. Routledge, 2013.

External links
 

1953 films
1953 Western (genre) films
American Western (genre) films
Films directed by Harry Keller
Republic Pictures films
American black-and-white films
1950s English-language films
1950s American films